Highway 90 is the longest Israeli road, at about , and stretches from Metula and the northern border with Lebanon, along the western side of the Sea of Galilee, through the Jordan River Valley, along the western bank of the Dead Sea (making it the world's lowest road), through the Arabah valley, and until Eilat and the southern border with Egypt on the Red Sea. The central section of the road traverses the Israeli-occupied West Bank; while it passes near the city of Jericho, it runs through Area C and does not enter areas controlled by the Palestinian Authority.

Highway
The section of highway 90 passing through the Jordan Valley was dedicated as Derekh Gandi (Gandhi's Road) after the late Rehavam Zeevi, an Israeli Minister of Tourism assassinated by Palestinian terrorists, who was nicknamed after Mahatma Gandhi.

The section of Route 90 passing the Dead Sea is named Dead Sea Highway, and it is this location that is the lowest road in the world. It is along this stretch of road that Masada, Ein Gedi nature reserve, Ein Gedi Spa, Qumran Caves, and Ahava are located. It is here that Route 90 intersects with Route 1, making it a major international tourism artery for travellers between the Sea of Galilee, Jerusalem and the Dead Sea.

There is no actual four-way intersection with Route 1. When traveling south along 90 from the Jordan Valley, the road intersects the eastern end of Route 1 at Beit HaArava Junction. Route 90 continues by making a left turn at the junction, then again turns south. A short distance later, Route 90 continues via a right turn at Lido Junction.

The section of Route 90 passing through the Arabah is named . The Arabah section of the proposed Railway to Eilat, if and when built, will be located nearby the Arava Highway in many places along the route.

History
Until the 1960s, a series of separate roads existed where the highway is today. After the Six-Day War, a section in the northern Dead Sea area was completed, making these roads contiguous. In the early 1980s, the road was assigned the number 90. The northernmost section of the highway, from Tiberias to Metula, is the oldest, having existed since the Ottoman period.

Construction activity
The Arava Highway is the main link from the resort and port city of Eilat towards the center of the country and at times handles a heavy mix of local, tourist and commercial trucking traffic on the two-lane road (one lane in each direction). That, coupled with the monotone nature of the desert landscape around it and the lack of a physical barrier between the opposing lanes of traffic, makes the road particularly prone to traffic accidents, which often occur at high speeds – earning it the nickname of "The Red Road". In October 2007, Israeli Transport Minister Shaul Mofaz announced that the 170 km section of Highway 90 between Arava Junction and Eilat would be renovated, widening and repaving in stages to a four lane configuration with a physical barrier in the middle and rest stops every 45 kilometres. Initial announced funding was NIS125 million; the total project budget for all stages of widening is NIS2.3 billion (equivalent to over US$650 million in 2013 dollars). As of the fall of 2013, 40 km of the highway had been widened by the National Roads Company, from Eilat to Yotvata. As of 2020, the section between Yotvata and Ketura (to the intersection with Highway 40) is undergoing widening. No date has been set yet for widening the long stretch of highway between Ketura and the Arava Junction.

Checkpoints
Route 90 has two permanent checkpoints: the Beit She'an-Bardala checkpoint in the north, near Sdei Trumot and the Bezeq Stream, and one in the south just north of Ein Gedi. Palestinians living in the West Bank are not allowed to pass these checkpoints unless permits from the Israeli authorities are obtained. According to B'Tselem, at the Beit She'an-Bardala checkpoint, during certain agricultural seasons, Palestinian trucks transporting agricultural produce are allowed to cross twice a week.

In addition, Palestinians are often stopped and turned back (for not having the right papers) at the Beit Ha'arava checkpoint leading to the Dead Sea.

Accidents
Route 90 is one of Israel's most dangerous highways.  Between 2003-2018, there were over 2,250 road accidents on Route 90, in which 223 people were killed, over 6,450 people were hurt, 700 of them seriously. Oz Dror, spokesperson for Or Yarok, the Association for Safer Driving in Israel, said in 2018: "Route 90 continues to claim victims and take lives as a result of a shaky infrastructure that is not forgiving of drivers' mistakes. It is always easier to blame the driver and the human factor, but the Ministry of Transport and Road Safety also has a responsibility. This is a road that was paved 50 years ago, and many years ago it was necessary to improve the infrastructure and turn it from a red road to a safe road. A separation railing must be installed between the lanes to prevent head-on accidents as early as tomorrow morning in order to prevent the next casualty. Road accidents are not fate but failure."

On 9 November 2018, Route 90 collapsed above Kidron Stream, 10 kilometers south to Kalya, near Ovnat, due to a flood which created a sinkhole.

The 2022 West Bank bus crash occurred on Highway 90.

Attempts to block
While in Israel blocking a route is a criminal offense, some attempts to block the road had been made during recent years.

 During March 2011 Israeli social workers' demonstrations, an attempt was made to block route 90.
 In April 2011, a group of people attempted to cycle from Nablus to Jericho, partially on road 90, as a celebration of Israeli rule over the West Bank.
 On 14 April 2012, a group of approximately 200 cyclists tried to join the road and were stopped by Lt. Col. Eisner. The incident became an international scandal resulting in Eisner being suspended.

See also
Highway 65 (Jordan) – The parallel road on the Jordanian side of the border

References

External links

 Route 90 and its Dangerous Curves
 Route 90 in The Times of Israel

Roads in Israel